The 1954 Northern Illinois State Huskies football team represented Northern Illinois State Teachers College—now known as Northern Illinois University—as a member of the Interstate Intercollegiate Athletic Conference (IIAC) during the 1954 college football season. Led by Chick Evans in his 26th and final season as head coach, the Huskies compiled an overall record of 2–7 with a mark of 1–5 in conference play, tying for sixth in the IIAC. The team played home games at the 5,500-seat Glidden Field, located on the east end of campus, in DeKalb, Illinois.

Schedule

References

Northern Illinois State
Northern Illinois Huskies football seasons
Northern Illinois State Huskies football